Wang Xiuyun (1945 – August 9, 2017) was a Singaporean television actress and prominently a full-time Mediacorp artiste. She died from kidney failure.

She is best remembered for her roles in local TV dramas broadcast during the 1980s and 1990s, particularly A Mother's Love (1989).

Personal life
A pioneer of Singapore’s television industry, Wang began her career in the 1970s with Radio Television Singapore. According to an 8 Days article, Wang left showbiz in 1998, though she still took on part-time roles. She then worked in retail in Metro before moving on to sell kitchenware in Takashimaya.

Death
Wang Xiuyun, as she was affectionately known among local actors and actresses, died from kidney failure on Wednesday morning on 9 August 2017 , as the rest of the nation was busy with preparations for National Day.

Mediacorp actress Xiang Yun was one of the first few to pay tribute to the veteran actress. The duo appeared in several productions together including local Mandarin series Housewives' Holiday (煮妇的假期).

On her Instagram account, Xiang Yun broke the news of Wang’s death. The actress shared that “her heart was heavy after hearing the news of Aunty Wang’s death”.

She described the late Wang as having “a sweet smile, big round eyes and a sweet voice” adding that she was always approachable and took care of her younger colleagues. Aside from Xiang Yun, other past and present Mediacorp stars such as Zheng Geping, Hong Huifang and Chen Xiuhuan turned up at Wang’s wake at Ang Mo Kio Avenue 8.
Wang is survived by her only daughter Ms Han Hua.

Filmography

References

1945 births
2017 deaths
Singaporean actresses